Formetanate is an insecticide and acaricide.  It is used on alfalfa grown for seed and on some fruits, including citrus, pome, and stone fruits.

See also
 Formparanate

External links

References

Acetylcholinesterase inhibitors
Acaricides
Carbamate insecticides
Amidines
Aromatic carbamates